The 1929 Kent State Golden Flashes football team represented Kent State during the 1929 college football season. In its fifth season under head coach Merle E. Wagoner, Kent State compiled a 1–7 record and was outscored by a total of 162 to 20.

The Chestnut Burr called the 1929 season a "building year" noting that most of the team would return for the 1930 season when Kent State would be a member of the Ohio Conference. The same publication also noted that the team's playing all but two of its games on the road, for the second straight year, was a "very regrettable feature" that put a burden on the team and deprived them of the support of the student body. The Chestnut Burr noted that the lack of home games was the result of "the lack of a suitable playing field" and called for the situation to be "remedied at once for the benefit of the entire school."

Schedule

Roster
The roster of the 1929 Kent State football team included the following:
 Deak Abbot, tackle
 William Disbro, halfback
 Elmer Dunlevy, guard
 Frank Fanelli, guard
 Louis Fogg, guard
 Clyde Hall, end
 James Hagerdon, end
 Chas Kilbourne, fullback and honorary captain
 James Mennow, halfback
 Ted Sapp, tackle
 Ward Seacrist, end
 Jake Searl, quarterback
 Arthur Stejskal, halfback
 Kermit Taylor, guard
 Alexander Young, halfback

References

Kent State
Kent State Golden Flashes football seasons
Kent State Golden Flashes football